Despite criticisms of being a vulgar form of humour, use of comic sound as a way of causing laughter has become a recognized and commonly used method. These types of sounds are typical of children's cartoons and slapstick comedy.

Key examples of its use in society and media works are:

 Flatulence - Various toys have been produced to replicate this sound, i.e., whoopie cushions.
 Ape or monkey-like noises.
 Saying a commonly recognized name in a humorous or unusual way.
 Saying the name of the person you are greeting on the exhale creating a skeletal voicetone.
 Coughing or sneezing in large amounts to either:
 Annoy a nearby person, possibly an authority figure.
 Intentionally cover up the end of a sentence or a certain word.
 A trumpet playing a descending passage with a Wah-wah mute to signify a failure or mistake.
 A short drum fill played after a joke's punchline (as in Stand-up comedy).
 Loud horn noises sounded when someone is struck in a painful manner.

References

Sound
Comedy